UFOs: Past, Present, and Future is a 1974 documentary film that examines several prominent UFO sightings from the post-war to contemporary era. It was re-released in 1976 and 1979 under the title UFOs: It Has Begun to coincide with renewed interest in the subject due to the release of Steven Spielberg's Close Encounters of the Third Kind. It is based on the book UFOs: Past, Present, and Future by Robert Emenegger.

Overview
The film is narrated by Rod Serling, Burgess Meredith, and José Ferrer. Serling and Meredith had previously worked together on The Twilight Zone. The 1979 re-release features commentary by noted UFOlogist and astronomer Jacques Vallée.  The film uses dramatizations, interviews with government officials and scientists, and selected footage to provide context for UFO sightings, both ancient and contemporary.

Production
In 1971, writer/composer Robert Emenegger was asked by either the U.S. Republican Party, officials at California's Norton Air Force Base, or the U.S. Department of Defense itself to produce a film about UFOS using only official DoD and NASA source material, and was allegedly promised footage of a 1964 landing at Holloman Air Force Base. Only a few seconds of this special footage ultimately made it into the film.

Synopsis

The film opens with Serling asking open-ended philosophical questions about the origin of humanity on Earth, juxtaposing evolution and religion with a variation on ancient astronauts. Serling steps in front of the camera, similar to his routine on The Twilight Zone, and suggests that just as humans look at the sky and question where we came from, so too might extraterrestrial beings.

The story's first vignette takes place outside Lubbock, Texas, on November 2, 1967. Around 11:00 pm, two men driving in a pickup truck experience engine trouble and radio interference. As they begin to check the engine, a bright white disk-shaped object approaches and shines a bluish beam directly at them. After a moment, it flies away. Once the object disappears, their truck starts right up, and the men leave to notify the police. Later, an Air Force investigation analyzes their story along with fifteen similar reports, and concludes that ball lightning phenomena is responsible. Serling warns that this may not be the only explanation.

The next section, detailing historical records, opens with Meredith reading from the Book of Ezekiel 1:4-28, which seems to provide an account of creatures who came down from the sky in a ball of fire; each with four faces, four wings, and calf-like feet, then rose back into the sky. Serling describes other ancient religious texts from Greeks and Romans about "phantom chariots," and that during the reign of Charlemagne accounts of "tyrants of the air" concerned the ruler so greatly that anyone reporting such aerial objects was to be put to death. Other historical examples include sightings in Leon, Spain; and an incident 1887 aboard a ship called the S.S. Siberian. Starting in the late 1890s, sightings of a "flying cigar" were reported across the U.S., including Oakland, CA, and Denver, CO.

A young Dr. Jacques Vallée then attempts to dispel the notion that UFO sightings were limited to the United States. He describes a wave of sightings that occurred in the late 1940s and 1950s in Scandinavia, Mexico, the Soviet Union, China, and the western coast of Africa. In 1973, a team led by a Jean Balgou of the Astrophysical Institute flew in a Concorde jet packed with scientists. At high altitude in the midst of a total eclipse, he uses a stop motion camera to photograph the sun rising over the horizon, and captured a suspicious object. While NASA takes no official position on the existence of UFOS, several astronauts on the Gemini, Apollo and Skylab missions have come forward with their own unexplainable observations and photographs.

Analyzed next are reports from former military officials and scientists. According to testimony from former U.S. Air Force officials, the Department of Defense first became interested in the UFO phenomenon in the late 1940s, concerned that it may constitute a military threat from a foreign power. The Air Force began a formal investigation under Project Sign which after only two weeks was complicated by the death of airman Capt. Mantell, an experienced pilot who crashed under suspicious circumstances outside Louisville, Kentucky. Public pressure was growing for answers, but the results of the investigation were classified and later squashed by USAF General Hoyt Vandenberg due to insufficient evidence. Several UFOs recorded by radar over the US capital reportedly were important enough for President Harry S. Truman to request being personally informed on all developments in the case. An F-94 intercept over Washington, D.C. caused all unknown radar signs to disappear once the fighters entered the city. As the fighters left DC airspace, the unknown objects reappeared. The confusion resulted in "the largest, and longest, press conference in the Pentagon since World War II." The radar issues were blamed on temperature inversion.

On January 14, 1953, the Central Intelligence Agency became involved, convening a panel of top scientists to further explore the phenomenon and its potential threat to national security. Their analysis concluded that the objects involved in several high-profile sightings were not aircraft, balloons, birds, "but that they were self-luminous, unidentified objects." Yet the panel found that they were indeed birds - being unidentified, they could be nothing else.

In 1966, an incident outside Ann Arbor pushes U.S. Representative Gerald Ford to set up a congressional hearing on UFOS, and it is opened by L. Mendel Rivers at the House Armed Services Committee.

Several unexplained animal mutilations of livestock are examined. While the official explanation is usually predation, interviews with ranchers suggest that they were not the result of predatory animals. The incisions in the animals do not conform to those made by steel tools, seemingly ruling out human behavior.

The film's conclusion begins with a brief overview of possible aircraft shapes, and a number of illustrations of extraterrestrials featured from Emenegger's book. A roundtable discussion featuring several of the film's scientists revolves around the hubris of mankind in believing we are the only sentient life in the universe.

Holloman landing story
Finally, a dramatized scenario of what may have occurred at Holloman Air Force Base is told by Serling. Three unidentified objects are detected approaching Holloman. Base Command contacts Edwards AFB, and try to attempt contact with the objects without success. A red alert is sounded, and fighters take off. A helicopter with a professional photographer aboard was in the air, and shot several feet of film. One of the crafts break away, and seems to attempt a landing. A crew on the ground runs off several hundred more feet of film. The vehicle hovers silently perhaps ten feet off the ground before landing on three extension pads. Several Air Force officials and scientists at the base await outside as the craft's panel opens:

"Stepping forward, are one, then two, and a third of what appear to be men, dressed in tight-fitting jumpsuits. Perhaps short, by our standards. With an odd blue-grey complexion, eyes set far apart, a large pronounced nose, they wear a headpiece that resembles a rope-like design. The commander and two scientists step forward to greet the visitors. Arrangements are made by some sort of communication, and the group quickly retires to an inner office in the 'King 1' area. Left behind stand a stunned group of military personnel. Who the visitors are, and where they're from, and what they want, is unknown."

Cast
 Rod Serling - Narrator
 Burgess Meredith - Narrator
 Jose Ferrer - Narrator
 Dr. Jacques Vallee - Narrator
 Dr. J. Allen Hynek - Interviewee
 Colonel Robert Friend USAF - Interviewee
 Colonel William Coleman, USAF former Project Blue Book Spokesman - Interviewee
 Colonel George Weinbrenner, former head of Foreign Technology at Wright Patterson AFB - Interviewee

Reception and legacy
In 1976, The Miami News reporter Marilyn Moore called it "a fine presentation on the topic, narrated by the late Rod Serling which serves as a sad reminder of the many excellent shows he gave us over the years."

According to Jason Colavito, sources conflict as to if the movie was commissioned by Republicans or Nixon for political purposes, but "It is clear that no one—not the government, or Rod Serling, or anyone else involved in this film—checked any of the facts at all before declaring that aliens and humans have long been interacting."

The Holloman landing sequence has been noted for it similarities to the finale of the later Spielberg film Close Encounters of the Third Kind.

Awards and nominations
The film was nominated for Best Documentary Film at the 33rd Golden Globe Awards. It lost to Youthquake!

See also
 Unidentified Flying Objects: The True Story of Flying Saucers, a similar film from 1956

References

External links
 
  
 Watch on YouTube

1974 films
1974 documentary films
American documentary films
1970s English-language films
1970s American films